Balys Macutkevičius  (1905–1964) was a Lithuanian painter.

See also
List of Lithuanian painters

References
Universal Lithuanian Encyclopedia

1905 births
1964 deaths
Artists from Vilnius
20th-century Lithuanian painters